Blastobasis moffetti is a moth in the family Blastobasidae that is endemic to New Caledonia.

The forewings are pale brown intermixed with brown and dark brown scales. The hindwings are pale greyish brown.

Etymology
The species is named in honour of Kenneth Daniel Moffett.

References

Moths described in 2002
Endemic fauna of New Caledonia
Blastobasis